"Yet" is a song written by Sonny LeMaire and Randy Sharp, and recorded by American country music group Exile.  It was released in August 1990 as the third single from their album Still Standing.  The song reached number 7 on the Billboard Hot Country Singles & Tracks chart in November 1990.

Critical reception
Lisa Smith and Cyndi Hoelzle of Gavin Report described the song favorably, saying that "This slow, desperate song builds 'til you
find yourself rooting for the guy, dying to know how it all turns out."

Chart performance

Year-end charts

References

1990 songs
1990 singles
Exile (American band) songs
Songs written by Randy Sharp
Songs written by Sonny LeMaire
Arista Nashville singles